The 1888–89 season was the 16th Scottish football season in which Dumbarton competed at a national level.

Scottish Cup

A successful run in the Scottish Cup brought Dumbarton to their eighth semi final and their first ever meeting with Celtic. On the day however the Glasgow side were to prove too strong and ran out 4-1 winners.

Dumbartonshire Cup
The trophy was lifted for the second time, beating their town rivals Dumbarton Athletic easily in the final.

Greenock Charity Cup
An invitation to compete in the Greenock Charity Cup was accepted, but Dumbarton lost out to the hosts Morton in the final.

Friendlies
During the season, 28 'friendly' matches were played, including home and away fixtures against Vale of Leven, Dumbarton Athletic and Queen's Park.  There were also matches against the current holders of the East of Scotland Shield (Mossend Swifts), the Lanarkshire Cup (Airdrie), the Renfrewshire Cup (St Mirren) and the Stirlingshire Cup (East Stirling), and a 3 match tour of the north of Scotland during the New Year holidays.  In England, matches were played against Sunderland and Sunderland Albion, and Dumbarton also gave the Welsh national team a tough work-out in a game at Boghead.  In all, 9 matches were won, 7 drawn and 12 lost, scoring goals 74 and conceding 67.

Player statistics
Dumbarton continued to attract some of the best players in Scotland, and joining up this season were Dickie Boyle and Geordie Dewar.
Amongst those leaving was internationalist Peter Miller after a career with the club spanning over 13 seasons.

Only includes appearances and goals in competitive Scottish Cup matches.

Source:

International caps

An international trial match was played on 16 February 1889 to consider selection of teams to represent Scotland in the upcoming games in the 1889 British Home Championship.

Geordie Dewar was selected to take part and subsequently earned his second cap against England.

Representative matches
Dumbarton players were selected to play in Dumbartonshire county matches as follows:

 - 'D' played for Dumbartonshire ; 'I' played for Internationals

In addition Geordie Dewar was selected to play for a 'Counties' team against a Glasgow Select on 4 October 1888 - Glasgow won 9-0.

Reserve team
Dumbarton lost in the second round of the Scottish Second XI Cup to Linthouse, but in the Dumbartonshire Second XI Cup, the trophy was won for the first time by beating Vale of Leven in the final.

References

Dumbarton F.C. seasons
Scottish football clubs 1888–89 season